NEOMA Business School is a French business and management school founded in 2013, following the merger of Reims Management School (founded in 1928) and Rouen Business School (founded in 1871).

NEOMA BS offers a wide range of educational programmes covering all fields of management such as bachelor's degrees,  Master in Management, MBA and EMBA programs, specialized MSc programs, a PhD in management, and various executive education offerings. The school is consistently rated by the Financial Times, The Economist and Challenges as one of the top business schools in continental Europe and one of the leading business schools worldwide.

NEOMA is part of the Conférence des Grandes écoles, and is one of the only 1% of business schools in the world holding the Triple accreditation from the three international accreditation organisations, EQUIS, AACSB and AMBA.
Presided over by Michel-Edouard Leclerc, the school has the status of a Consular Higher Education Institution (EESC). The school dean is Delphine Manceau.

Its student body is made up of 9,000 students, 25% of whom come from international backgrounds. The students study on the three different campuses in Reims, Rouen and Paris. Its merged Alumni Network is one of the leading alumni networks in France, with 72,000 graduates.

History 
The Advanced Business School of Rouen was created in 1873. It took the name Rouen Business School at the beginning of the new millennium.

The Advanced Business School of Reims was created in 1928. It took the name Reims Management School at the beginning of the new millennium.

NEOMA Business School was created at the start of the 2013 school year following the merger of the two founding schools. This merger was carried out by the Reims and Rouen Chambers of Commerce and Industry.

Grande école degrees 
NEOMA Business School is a grande école, a French institution of higher education that is separate from, but parallel and often connected to, the main framework of the French public university system. Grandes écoles are elite academic institutions that admit students through an extremely competitive process, and a significant proportion of their graduates occupy the highest levels of French society. Similar to Ivy League schools in the United States, Oxbridge in the UK, and C9 League in China, graduation from a grande école is considered the prerequisite credential for any top government, administrative and corporate position in France.

The degrees are accredited by the Conférence des Grandes Écoles and awarded by the Ministry of National Education (France). Higher education business degrees in France are organized into three levels thus facilitating international mobility: the Licence / Bachelor's degrees, and the Master's and Doctorat degrees. The Bachelors and the Masters are organized in semesters: 6 for the Bachelors and 4 for the Masters. Those levels of study include various "parcours" or paths based on UE (Unités d'enseignement or Modules), each worth a defined number of European credits (ECTS). A student accumulates those credits, which are generally transferable between paths. A Bachelors is awarded once 180 ECTS have been obtained (bac + 3); a Masters is awarded once 120 additional credits have been obtained (bac +5). The highly coveted PGE (Grand Ecole Program) ends with the degree of Master's in Management (MiM)

Educational programmes 
A large portfolio of programmes, from bachelor's degrees to Executive Education:

 A general flagship programme: Masters in Management 2/3-year > 5-year
 Specialised programmes: TEMA (innovation & digital) undergraduate > 5-year bachelor's degree; ECAL Bachelor's degree > 3-year bachelor's degrees
 International and multicultural programmes: CESEM undergraduate > 4-year bachelor's degree
 Programmes with a strong corporate focus: Global BBA undergraduate > 4-year bachelor's degree
 Advanced programmes: Advanced Masters or Masters of Science, full-time or block release, taught in French or English 4/5-year bachelor's degree > 5-year bachelor's degree
 Executive Education: a Global Executive MBA and an adaptable offer for companies and working executives
 Doctoral school: DBA and PhD in Management

Innovative experiential pedagogy has a central focus in the school's courses, with role-playing, peer learning and “Learning how to learn” orientation. The school is a forerunner in the use of immersive virtual reality (IVR) in its management courses.

International 
The school teaches its students to apply solid managerial skills in a globalised and multicultural professional environment. In addition to providing multicultural exposure on its campuses, the curriculums include periods of cultural immersion through student exchanges at its 335 partner schools and in companies abroad.

Academic and economic links with China 

NEOMA Business School, after being specifically selected by the Hanban, launched in 2014 the first Confucius Institute for Business of France, and the seventh in the world. Other Confucius Institutes for Business are notably present in the London School of Economics and the New York State University. NEOMA Business School, which welcomes each year 300 Chinese students, has many Chinese academic partners, among which Renmin University, the Beijing University of International Business and Economics, Nankai University and Wuhan University. NEOMA BS stated that the institute will act as a platform dedicated to the optimisation of economic relations between China and France by providing solutions and helping local companies develop their business activities in China. Laurent Fabius, a former French Foreign Minister, inaugurated the event. That same year, NEOMA Business School opened a Doctorate of Business Administration programme in Shanghai.

Research and entrepreneurship 
Over the last 5 years, NEOMA faculty have authored nearly 500 research articles in peer reviewed publications. NEOMA supports several centers of excellence and research: 

The Future of Work - Leadership; Jobs and working conditions; Organising; and Knowledge. 65+ research projects;
The World We Want - Developing sustainable practices; Finance for good; Health, well-being, and happiness; Inclusion, equality, and diversity. 80+ research projects;
The Complexity Advantage - Value chain and operations; Markets, information, and complexity; Social and organizational complexity; Crowds; Problems, solutions, and decision making. 110+ research projects;
AI, Data Science & Business - Data science & value creation; AI-based competitive advantage & growth; Unintended consequences of AI and data science; Users experience of AI. 50+ research projects.

In 2011, NEOMA created a Starup Lab for students and alumni. Over 225 start-ups have been launched, and over 100 projects are in incubation every year. The Startup Lab consists of 3 incubators, 2 specialised accelerators, and a Coding School to support the creation and development of start-ups.

Rankings 
In 2020, it was recently ranked 6th in the French Challenges business schools ranking. and 9th ex-aequo in Le Figaro Business school ranking.

In 2022, the Financial Times ranked its Masters in Management program 32nd in the world. It was ranked 30th in the 2021 Financial Times ranking of Masters in Management programs and 19th in The Economist.

Notable alumni 
The NEOMA Alumni network brings together and connects nearly 72,000 graduates and future graduates. The merger of the two former schools has helped to develop the fourth most active alumni network among French business schools.
 Robin Leproux, 1983, Former President of Paris Saint-German Football Club

Gallery

References 

Business schools in France
Grandes écoles
Education in Rouen
Education in Reims
Education in Paris